Khwaja Ahmad Abbas (7 June 1914 – 1 June 1987) was an Indian film director, screenwriter, novelist, and journalist in Urdu, Hindi and English. He won four National Film Awards in India. Internationally, his films won the Palme d'Or (Golden Palm Grand Prize) at Cannes Film Festival (out of three Palme d'Or nominations) and the Crystal Globe at Karlovy Vary International Film Festival. As a director and screenwriter, he is considered one of the pioneers of Indian parallel or neo-realistic cinema.

As a director, he made Hindustani films. Dharti Ke Lal (1946), about the Bengal famine of 1943, was one of Indian cinema's first social-realist films, and opened up the overseas market for Indian films in the Soviet Union. Pardesi (1957) was nominated for the Palme d'Or. Shehar Aur Sapna (1963) won the National Film Award for Best Feature Film, while Saat Hindustani (1969) and Do Boond Pani (1972) both won the National Film Awards for Best Feature Film on National Integration.

As a screenwriter, he wrote a number of neo-realistic films, such as Dharti Ke Lal (which he directed), Neecha Nagar (1946) which won the Palme d'Or at the first Cannes Film Festival, Naya Sansar (1941), Jagte Raho (1956), and Saat Hindustani (which he also directed). He is also known for writing Raj Kapoor's films, including the Palme d'Or-nominated Awaara (1951), as well as Shree 420 (1955), Mera Naam Joker (1970), Bobby (1973) and Henna (1991).

His column ‘Last Page’ was one of the longest-running newspaper columns in the history of Indian journalism. It began in 1935, in The Bombay Chronicle, and moved to the Blitz after the Chronicle'''s closure, where it continued until his death in 1987. He was awarded the Padma Shri by the Government of India in 1969.

Biography

 Early life and education
Abbas was born in Panipat, Undivided Punjab. He was born in the home of Altaf Hussain Hali, a student of Mirza Ghalib. His grandfather Khwaja Gulam Abbas was one of the chief rebels of the 1857 Rebellion movement, and the first martyr of Panipat to be blown from the mouth of a cannon. Abbas's father Ghulam-Us-Sibtain graduated from Aligarh Muslim University, was a tutor of a prince and a businessman, who modernised the preparation of Unani medicines. Abbas's mother, Masroor Khatoon, was the daughter of Sajjad Husain, an educator.

Abbas attended Hali Muslim High School, which was established by his great grandfather, Hali. He was instructed to read the Arabic text of the Quran and matriculated at the age of fifteen.

He gained a Bachelor of Arts degree in English literature in 1933 and a Bachelor of Laws degree in 1935 from Aligarh Muslim University.

Career
After leaving university, Abbas began his career as a journalist at the National Call, a New Delhi-based newspaper. Later while studying law in 1934, started Aligarh Opinion.

He joined The Bombay Chronicle in 1935 as a political correspondent and later became a film critic for the newspaper.

He entered films as a part-time publicist for Bombay Talkies in 1936, a production house owned by Himanshu Rai and Devika Rani, to whom he sold his first screenplay Naya Sansar (1941).

While at The Bombay Chronicle, (1935–1947), he started a weekly column called 'Last Page', which he continued when he joined the Blitz magazine. "The Last Page", (‘Azad Kalam’ in the Urdu edition), became the longest-running political column in India's history (1935–87). A collection of these columns was later published as two books. He continued to write for The Blitz and Mirror till his last days.

Meanwhile, he had started writing scripts for other directors, Neecha Nagar for Chetan Anand and Dr. Kotnis Ki Amar Kahani for V. Shantaram.

In 1945, he made his directorial debut with a film based on the Bengal famine of 1943, Dharti Ke Lal (Children of the Earth) for the Indian People's Theatre Association (IPTA). In 1951, he founded his own production company called Naya Sansar, which consistently produced films that were socially relevant including, Anhonee, Munna, Rahi (1953), based on a Mulk Raj Anand story, was on the plight of workers on tea plantations, the National Film Award winner, Shehar Aur Sapna (1964) and Saat Hindustani (1969), which won the Nargis Dutt Award for Best Feature Film on National Integration and is also remembered as Bollywood icon Amitabh Bachchan's debut film.
He wrote the story for the controversial themed film in 1974 Call Girl starring Zahera.

Abbas wrote 73 books in English, Hindi and Urdu and was considered a leading light of the Urdu short story. His best known fictional work remains 'Inquilab', which made him a household name in Indian literature. Like Inquilab, many of his works were translated into many Indian, and foreign languages, like Russian, German, Italian, French and Arabic.

Abbas interviewed several renowned personalities in literary and non-literary fields, including the Russian Prime Minister Khrushchov, American President Roosevelt, Charlie Chaplin, Mao-Tse-Tung and Yuri Gagarin.

He went on to write scripts for Jagte Raho, and prominent Raj Kapoor films including Awaara, Shri 420, Mera Naam Joker, Bobby and Henna.

His autobiography, I Am not an Island: An Experiment in Autobiography, was published in 1977 and again in 2010.

Censorship case
In 1968, Abbas made a documentary film called Char Shaher Ek Kahani (A Tale of Four Cities). The film depicted the contrast between the luxurious life of the rich in the four cities of Calcutta, Bombay, Madras and Delhi and that of the squalor and poverty of the poor. He approached the Central Board of Film Certification to obtain a 'U' (Unrestricted Public Exhibition) certificate. Abbas was however informed by the regional office of the Board that film was not eligible to be granted a 'U' certificate but was suitable for exhibition only for adults. His appeal to the revising committee of the Central Board of Film Certification led to the decision of the censors being upheld.

Khwaja Ahmad Abbas further appealed to the Central Government but the government decided to grant the film a 'U' certificate provided certain scenes were cut. Following this, Abbas approached the Supreme Court of India by filing a writ petition under Article 19(1) of the Indian Constitution. He claimed that his fundamental right of free speech and expression was denied by the Central Government's refusal to grant the film a 'U' certificate. Abbas also challenged the constitutional validity of pre-censorship on films.

However the Supreme Court of India upheld the constitutional validity pre-censorship on films.

Awards and honours
 Films 
 1942: BFJA Awards: Best Screenplay: Naya Sansar (1941)
 1946: Wrote screenplay for Neecha Nagar, which became the only Indian film to win the Palme d'Or (Golden Palm) at the Cannes Film Festival.
 1951: Wrote screenplay for Awaara, which was nominated for the Palme d'Or at the Cannes Film Festival.
 1956: Wrote screenplay for Jagte Raho, which won the Crystal Globe Grand Prix at the Karlovy Vary International Film Festival in 1957, and the Certificate of Merit at the fourth National Film Awards.
 1958 Cannes Film Festival: Pardesi nominated for Palme d'Or (Golden Palm)
 1960: All India Certificate of Merit for the Second Best Children's Film – Idd Mubarak 1964: National Film Award for Best Feature Film: Shehar Aur Sapna 1964: Maharashtra State Award: Fakira 1965: International Film Festival Awards at Santa Barbara, USA: Hamara Ghar 1966: Jury Member: 16th Berlin International Film Festival
 1970: Nargis Dutt Award for Best Feature Film on National Integration at National Film Awards: Saat Hindustani 1972: Nargis Dutt Award for Best Feature Film on National Integration at National Film Awards: Do Boond Pani 1980: Gold Award for direction: The NaxalitesLiterary
Haryana State Robe of Honour for literary achievements in 1969, the Ghalib Award for his contribution to Urdu prose literature in 1983

Vorosky Literary Award of the Soviet Union in 1984, Urdu Akademi Delhi Special Award 1984, Maharashtra State Urdu Akademi Award in 1985 and the Soviet Award for his contribution to the cause of Indo-Soviet Friendship in 1985.

Filmography
 
 Naya Sansar (1941) – Screenplay, Story
 Dharti Ke Lal (1946) – Screenwriter, director, producer
 Dr. Kotnis Ki Amar Kahani (1946) – Screenwriter, Story
 Neecha Nagar (1946) – Screenwriter
 Aaj Aur Kal (1947) – Director
 Awara (1951) – Screenwriter, Dialogue
 Anhonee (1952) – Screenwriter, Dialogue, Story, director, producer
 Rahi 1953 – Director
 Munna (1954) – Screenwriter, director, producer
 Shree 420 (1955) – Screenwriter, Dialogue, Story
 Jagte Raho (1956) – Screenwriter
 Pardesi (1957)– Screenwriter, director
 Char Dil Char Rahen (1959) – Screenwriter, Dialogue, director
 Eid Mubarak (1960) Documentary / Short – Director
 Gir Game Sanctuary (1961) Documentary – Director
 Flight to Assam (1961) – Director
 Gyara Hazar Ladkian (1962) – Director
 Teen Gharaney (1963) – Director
 Shehar Aur Sapna (1964) – Director, screenwriter
 Hamara Ghar (1964) – Director
 Tomorrow Shall Be Better (1965) Documentary – Director
 Aasman Mahal (1965) – Director
 Bambai Raat Ki Bahon Mein (1967) – Writer, director, producer
 Dharti Ki Pukaar (1967) Short Film – Director
 Chaar Shaher Ek Kahani (1968) Documentary – Director
 Saat Hindustani (1969) – Director, producer
 Mera Naam Joker (1970) – Screenwriter, Story
 Do Boond Pani (1971) – Director
 Bharat Darshan (1972) Documentary - Director
 Luv Kush (1972) Short film - Director
 Bobby (1973) – Screenwriter, Story
 Kal Ki Baat (1973) Short Film – Director
 Call Girl (1973) - Story and Screenplay
 Achanak (1973) – Screenwriter
 Juhu (1973) (TV) – Director
 Faslah (1974) – Director, producer
 Papa Miya of Aligarh (1975) Documentary – Director
 Phir Bolo Aaye Sant Kabir (1976) Documentary – Director
 Dr. Iqbal (1978) – Documentary – Director
 The Naxalites (1980) – Screenwriter, director
 Hindustan Hamara (1983) Documentary / Short – Director
 Love in Goa (1983) – Screenwriter
 Nanga Fakir (1984) (TV) – Director
 Ek Aadmi (1988) – Director
 Akanksha (1989) (TV) – Dialogue, Screenplay
 Henna (1991) – Story

Books
His books in English, Urdu and Hindi include: including:
 Outside India: The Adventures of a Roving Reporter, Hali Pub. House, Delhi, 1939.
 An Indian looks at America (The Rampart library of good reading), 1943.
 An Indian looks at America, Thacker, Bombay, 1943.
 Tomorrow is ours! A novel of the India of Today; Bombay, Popular Book Depot, 1943.
 "Let India fight for freedom", Bombay, Sound magazine (Publication dept.), 1943.
 Defeat for death: A story without names, Padmaja Publications 1944.
 "...and One Did Not Come Back!", Sound magazine, 1944
 A report to Gandhiji: A survey of Indian and world events during the 21 months of Gandhiji's incarceration, 1944
 Invitation to Immortality: a one-act play, Bombay: Padma Pub., 1944.
 Not all Lies. Delhi: Rajkamal Pub., 1945.
 Blood and stones and other stories. Bombay: Hind Kitabs, 1947
 Rice and other stories, Kutub, 1947
 Kashmir fights for freedom, 1948
 I Write as I Feel, Hind Kitabs, Bombay, 1948
 Cages of freedom and other stories, Bombay, Hind Kitabs Ltd., 1952.
 China can make it: Eye-witness account of the amazing industrial progress in new China, 1952.
 In the Image of Mao Tse-Tung, Peoples Publishing House, 1953
 INQILAB. First Great Novel of the Indian Revolution, Jaico Publishing House, 1958
 Face To Face with Khrushchov, Rajpal & Sons, 1960
 Till We Reach the Stars. The Story of Yuri Gagarin, Asia Pub. House, 1961
 The Black sun and Other stories, Jaico Publishing House, 1963.
 Raat ki bahon mein, Hindi, Radhakr̥ishṇa Prakashan, 1965.
 Indira Gandhi; return of the red rose, Hind Pocket Books, New Delhi, 1966.
 Divided heart, Paradise Publications, 1968
 When Night Falls, 1968.
 Chabili, Hindi, Allahabad, Mitra Prakashan, 1968.
 The most beautiful woman in the world, Paradise Publications, 1968
 Salma aur Samundar, Urdu/Hindi, New Delhi, Komala Pocket Books, 1969.
 Mera Naam Joker, 1970
 Maria, Delhi, Hind Pocket Books, 1971.
 Teen Pahiye, Urdu/Hindi, Delhi, Rajpal & Sons, 1971.
 Bobby, Urdu/Hindi, 1973
 Boy meets Girl, Sterling Publishers, 1973
 That Woman: Her Seven Years in Power; New Delhi, Indian Book Co., 1973
 Jawaharlal Nehru: Portrait of an integrated Indian; New Delhi, NCERT, 1974.
 Fasilah", Urud/Hindi, Hind Pocket Books, Delhi, 1974
 Distant dream, New Delhi, Sterling Pub., 1975.
 The walls of glass: A novel, 1977
 Barrister-at-law: A play about the early life of Mahatma Gandhi, New Delhi, Orient Paperbacks, 1977.
 Men and women: Specially selected long and short stories, 1977
 Mad, mad, mad world of Indian films, 1977
 I Am not an Island: An Experiment in Autobiography, New Delhi, 1977.
 Four Friends, Arnold-Heinemann, New Delhi, 1977.
 20 March 1977: a day like any other day, Vikas Publishing House, New Delhi, 1978.
 Janata in a jam?, 1978.
 The Naxalites, Lok Publications, 1979.
 Bread, beauty, and revolution: being a chronological selection from the Last pages, 1947 to 1981, Marwah Publications, New Delhi, 1982.
 Nili Sari aur Doosri Kahaniyan̲, Urdu, Maktabah-e-Jamia, New Delhi, 1982.
 The gun and other stories, Arnold-Heinemann, New Delhi, 1985.
 The Thirteenth Victim, Amar Prakashan, 1986.
 The World Is My Village: A Novel With An Index, Ajanta, 1984. 
 Bombay My Bombay: A Love Story of the City, Ajanta Publications/Ajanta Books International, 1987. 
 Indira Gandhi: The Last Post; Bombay, Ramdas G. Bhatkal, 1989
 Defeat for death: a story without names. Baroda: Padmaja Pub., 1994
 How Films Are Made, National Book Trust, 1999, 
 Soney Chandi ke Butt, Urdu, Alhamra, 2001, 
 For detailed listing :South Asian literature in English, Pre-independence era 

Books on Khwaja Ahmad Abbas
 Ahmad Hasib, The Novels of Khwaja Ahmad Abbas, Seema. 1987
 Hemendra Singh Chandalia, Ethos of Khwaja Ahmad Abbas, novelist, film-maker, and journalist: A study in social realism, Bohra Prakashan (1996)
 Raj Narain Raz, Khawaja Ahmed Abbas-Ifkar. Guftar, Kirdar, Haryana Urdu Akademi
 Vasudev and Lenglet, eds., Indian Cinema Super-bazaar, Vikas, New Delhi, 1978.

Articles on Khwaja Ahmad Abbas
 Dr. R.G. Mathapati, "Abbas: An Island"
 Indian Film Culture (New Delhi), no. 4, September 1964.
 Film World, vol. 1, no. 10, October 1978.
 Ghish, S., "K. A. Abbas: A Man in Tune with History", Screen (Bombay), 19 June 1987.
 Obituary in Jump Cut (Berkeley, California), no. 33, February 1988.
 Abbas, Communicator of repute, The Dawn, 13 October 2002.
 Shoba S. Rajgopal, The Legacy of Ajitha
 Ismat Chughtai, "Bachu", Urdu
 V. P. Sathe, "K.A. Abbas, The Crusader", Filmfare, 16–30 June 1987

See also
 Indian Writers
 IPTA

References

Cited sources
 
 
 S. Ghosh, "K. A. Abbas: A Man in Tune with History", Screen (Bombay), 19 June 1987, p. 14.
 Dictionary of Films (Berkeley: U. of CA Press, 1977), p. 84.
 Shyamala A. Narayan, The Journal of Commonwealth Literature, 1 1976; vol. 11: pp. 82 – 94.
 Ravi Nandan Sinha, Essays on Indian Literature in English''. Jaipur, Book Enclave, 2002, ch. 7.

External links

 
 K.A. Abbas at Film Reference
 K.A. Abbas- The Dawn
 Filmography – NY Times
 

 
1914 births
1987 deaths
People from Panipat
Aligarh Muslim University alumni
Urdu-language short story writers
Hindi-language film directors
Urdu-language film directors
20th-century Indian Muslims
Indian male screenwriters
Indian columnists
Indian autobiographers
Indian male novelists
Indian male journalists
Indian People's Theatre Association people
Recipients of the Padma Shri in arts
Hindi film producers
20th-century Indian novelists
Screenwriters from Haryana
Journalists from Haryana
Novelists from Haryana
Directors who won the Best Feature Film National Film Award
Directors who won the Best Children's Film National Film Award
Producers who won the Best Film on National Integration National Film Award
Directors who won the Best Film on National Integration National Film Award
20th-century Indian screenwriters